Skatval is a village in the municipality of Stjørdal in Trøndelag county, Norway. The inhabitants are called as Skatvalsbygg. Skatval Church is located in the village.

History

The southwestern coast of the peninsula was called Aglo during the Viking Age.  In autumn 962, Sigurd Håkonsson Ladejarl (the ruling Earl of Trøndelag and surrounding areas) and his party were burned to death by the Erikssønene (sons of Eric Bloodaxe), among them Harald Greyhide, while staying the night at a party at Oglo (Aglo), according to the Heimskringla by Snorri Sturlasson.

The remains of Steinvikholm Castle, built during the 1530s by Norway's last Catholic archbishop, Olav Engelbrektsson, are under restoration. The fortress, innovative in design, played a major part as the last stronghold for Norwegian independence during the Reformation in the Danish-Norwegian union. The islet situated at the northern coast of Skatval is also the place for the yearly outdoor midnight opera "Olav Engelbrektsson".

The old Fløan Church was located in Fløan, on the northern coast of the Skatval peninsula.  It was the main church for Skatval.  It was taken down in 1851, and a new Skatval Church was built in 1901 in the village of Skatval.  Materials from the old church are now in a museum in Trondheim.

On 1 January 1902, the Skatvold peninsula was established as the municipality of Skatval when the old municipality of Nedre Stjørdal was divided into three parts: Skatval, Stjørdal, and Lånke.  On 1 January 1962, Skatval was merged with Lånke, Stjørdal, and Hegra to form a new, larger municipality of Stjørdal.

Transport
The Nordland Line runs through Skatval, with a stop at Skatval Station, with hourly Trøndelag Commuter Rail service. The station opened on 29 October 1902 and was designed by Paul Due. European Route E6 runs through Skatval.

Sports
The community has a football team, IL Fram, that plays in the 4th division.  The village and surrounding areas also have many sports facilities such as:
 Klempen Ski Arena: lighted cross country track, biathlon shooting range and several ski jumps, some with summer capabilities.
 Langstein: lighted cross country track.
 Framnes: artificial turf football field with flood lights.
 Skatvalshallen: indoor sports hall.
 Skjervold: tennis court.

Notable residents
Jon Olav Alstad, a politician
Eli Arnstad, a civil servant
Marit Arnstad, a politician, former Norwegian Minister of Petroleum and Energy
Oscar Midtlyng, an athlete
Brit Sandaune, a soccer player

References

External links

Skatval map
Skatval Historical Society
Olav Engelbrektsson Midnight Opera

Villages in Trøndelag
Stjørdal